The yellow-red rat snake (Pseudelaphe flavirufa) is a species of snake in the family Colubridae. The species is endemic to Mexico and Central America. Three subspecies are recognized.

Geographic range
P. flavirufa is found in the Mexican states of Campeche, Chiapas, Oaxaca, Puebla, Querétaro, Quintana Roo, San Luis Potosí, Tamaulipas, and Zacatecas. It is also found in Belize, Guatemala, Honduras, and Nicaragua.

Description
Dorsally, it is yellowish or pale brown with a series of reddish or chestnut-brown spots, which are black-edged and may be confluent into a zigzag stripe. There is an alternating lateral series of smaller spots on each side of the dorsal series. Ventrally, it is yellowish, either plain or with small brown spots.

Reproduction
P. flavirufa is oviparous.

Subspecies
There are three subspecies of P. flavirufa, including the nominotypical subspecies, which are recognized as being valid.
Pseudelaphe flavirufa flavirufa 
Pseudelaphe flavirufa matudai 
Pseudelaphe flavirufa pardalina 

Nota bene: A trinomial authority in parentheses indicates that the subspecies was originally described in a genus other than Pseudelaphe.

Etymology
The subspecific name, matudai, is in honor of Japanese-Mexican botanist Eizi Matuda.

References

Further reading
Cope ED (1867). "Fifth Contribution to the Herpetology of Tropical America". Proceedings of the Academy of Natural Sciences of Philadelphia 18: 317–323. (Coluber flavirufus, new species, p. 319).
Heimes, Peter (2016). Snakes of Mexico: Herpetofauna Mexicana Vol. I. Frankfurt, Germany: Chimaira. 572 pp. .
Mertens, Robert, Rosenberg, Hans (1943). "Elaphe flavirufa (Cope), die mexikanische Nachnatter ". Wochenschrift für Aquarien- und Terrarienkunde 37 (3): 60–62. (Pseudoelaphe flavirufus, new combination). (in German).

Colubrids
Reptiles described in 1867
Reptiles of Mexico